is a subway station on the Toei Mita Line in Minato, Tokyo, Japan, operated by the Tokyo subway operator Tokyo Metropolitan Bureau of Transportation (Toei).

Lines
Onarimon Station is served by the Toei Mita Line, and is numbered "I-06".

Station layout
The station has one island platform serving two tracks on the second basement ("B2F") level.

History
The station opened on 27 November 1973.

See also
 List of railway stations in Japan

External links

 Toei station information 

Railway stations in Japan opened in 1972
Railway stations in Tokyo
Toei Mita Line